Polysacos is an extinct genus of multiplacophorans (chitons) known from articulated Carboniferous fossils; its seventeen shell plates are arranged in three rows, with seven iterated units. It demonstrates that multiplacophora are related to modern polyplacophora. It was fringed with a ring of hollow spines resembling those of the Ordovician Echinochiton.

References 

Prehistoric chiton genera